State Route 350 (SR 350) is a  east–west state highway in the southwest portion of the U.S. state of Ohio.

Route description
SR 350 passes through portions of Warren and Clinton Counties along its way.  No portion of this state highway is included within the National Highway System (NHS).  The NHS is a network of highways determined to be most important for the nation's economy, mobility and defense. Between US-22 & SR 123, SR 350 is closed to trucks due to several sharp bends.

History
The SR 350 designation was applied in 1935.  The highway originally ran entirely within Warren County, along its current alignment from its western terminus at SR 123 southeast of Lebanon to its junction with the concurrency of U.S. Route 22 (US 22) and SR 3 west of Clarksville.

In 1938, SR 350 was extended east along a previously un-numbered roadway into Clinton County, where its new endpoint was at its junction with SR 73 northwest of New Vienna.  One year later, SR 350 was extended via a short concurrency southeast with SR 73, then northeasterly along a new state highway alignment to Sabina, where it intersected US 22/SR 3 a second time, and came to an end.  No sooner than that extension took place, in 1940 the majority of it was reversed when a southward extension of SR 729 replaced the segment between SR 73 and US 22/SR 3.  Consequently, in lieu of SR 350 being reinstated to its 1938 eastern terminus at SR 73, it was instead routed to continue southeast along SR 73 from the new southern terminus of SR 729 into New Vienna, where the route came to an end at its present eastern terminus where SR 73 meets SR 28.

Major intersections

References

350
Transportation in Clinton County, Ohio
Transportation in Warren County, Ohio